KF Selenica is an Albanian football club that is based in Selenicë, Vlorë County. Their home ground is the Selenicë Stadium which had a capacity of around 4,000. The club was founded in 1930 as KS 21 Shkurti and they typically competed in the lower divisions of Albanian football, but they did compete in the 1991–92 Albanian National Championship under manager Sotir Seferaj as well reach the quarter-finals of the Albanian Cup in the same season.

History
The club was founded in 1930 as KS 21 Shkurti Selenicë and they competed as an amateur team for the majority of their early history, playing against teams representing other towns and cities in Albania at the time. The club first competed in a national competition during the 1949 Albanian Second Division under the name SK Selenicë, where they competed in Group 11 of a 57-team tournament. They faced local sides Mifoli, Ndërmarrja Bujqësore e Shtetit Llakatundi and Narta in Group 11, but none of these sides progressed through to the next round. They competed in the same competing the following season where they were knocked out in the first round by Narta in the first round after losing 1–0 and then 3–0 in a two-legged tie. In 1951, the club was forced by the ruling communist party to change its name to Puna Selenicë; Puna literally translates to 'work'.

Honours
Albanian Second Division
Winners (1): 1988–89

References

Selenicë
Association football clubs established in 1930
1930 establishments in Albania
Selenicë
Albanian Third Division clubs
Kategoria e Dytë clubs